Gnarosophia is a genus of air-breathing land snails, terrestrial pulmonate gastropod mollusks in the family Camaenidae.

Species 
Species within the genus Gnarosophia include:
 Gnarosophia bellendenkerensis (Brazier, 1875)

References 

Camaenidae